Tillandsia quaquaflorifera is a species of flowering plant in the genus Tillandsia. This species is endemic to Mexico.

References

quaquaflorifera
Flora of Mexico